The orthography of the Greek language ultimately has its roots in the adoption of the Greek alphabet in the 9th century BC. Some time prior to that, one early form of Greek, Mycenaean, was written in Linear B, although there was a lapse of several centuries (the Greek Dark Ages) between the time Mycenaean stopped being written and the time when the Greek alphabet came into use.

Early Greek writing in the Greek alphabet was phonemic, different in each dialect.  Since the adoption of the Ionic variant for Attic in 403 BC, however, Greek orthography has been largely conservative and historical.

Given the phonetic development of Greek, especially in the Hellenistic period, certain modern vowel phonemes have multiple orthographic realizations:
 can be spelled η, ι, υ, ει, οι, or υι (see Iotacism);
 can be spelled either ε or αι;
 can be spelled either ο or ω.
This affects not only lexical items but also inflectional affixes, so correct orthography requires mastery of formal grammar, e.g.   'the good one (fem. sing.)' vs.   'the good ones (masc. pl.)';   'I call' vs.   'good (neut. sing.)'.

Similarly, the orthography preserves ancient doubled consonants, though these are now pronounced the same as single consonants, except in Cypriot Greek.

Digraphs and diphthongs 
A digraph is a pair of letters used to write one sound or a combination of sounds that does not correspond to the written letters in sequence. The orthography of Greek includes several digraphs, including various pairs of vowel letters that used to be pronounced as diphthongs but have been shortened to monophthongs in pronunciation. Many of these are characteristic developments of modern Greek, but some were already present in Classical Greek. None of them is regarded as a letter of the alphabet.

During the Byzantine period, it became customary to write the silent iota in digraphs as an iota subscript.

Hyphenation rules of Standard Modern Greek

Consonant splitting 

According to KEME (1983), the splitting of a Modern Greek word into syllables (syllabification) is governed by the following rules:

 C1: A single consonant between two vowels is hyphenated with the succeeding vowel. 
 C2: A sequence of two consonants between two vowels is hyphenated with the succeeding vowel, if a Greek word exists that begins with such a consonant sequence. Otherwise the sequence is split into two syllables. 
 C3: A sequence of three or more consonants between two vowels is hyphenated with the succeeding vowel, if a Greek word exists that begins with the sequence of the first two consonants. Otherwise it splits; the first consonant being hyphenated with the preceding vowel.

Loanword hyphenation is governed by the same grammar rules as the rest of the Standard Modern Greek language.

Vowel splitting 

The prohibitive hyphenation rules regarding vowel splitting are as follows:

 V1. Double-vowel blends do not split. 
 V2. The combinations αυ, ευ, ηυ, αύ, εύ and ηύ do not split.
 V3. Diphthongs do not split. 
 V4. Excessive diphthongs do not split. 

All of the above rules are negative in that they indicate impermissible hyphen points within particular substrings of consecutive vowels.

Diacritics

Polytonic spelling uses a variety of diacritics to represent aspects of the pronunciation of ancient Greek. Polytonic, along with lowercase letters, became standard in Byzantine Greek, although the ancient distinctions had disappeared, replaced by a simple stress accent. The orthographies of modern Greek, both katharevousa and dhimotiki, used the polytonic system until 1982, when monotonic spelling was introduced.  In some conservative contexts, such as the Church, polytonic spellings are still used.

Monotonic orthography, adopted in 1982, replaces the ancient diacritics with just two: the acute accent (tónos, e.g. ), used to mark the stressed syllable in polysyllabic words, and the diaeresis (dialytiká, e.g. ), which indicates that the vowel is not part of a digraph.

Punctuation

In Ancient Greek 

Ancient Greek was written as  without spacing or interpuncts. Over time, a variety of symbols appeared. A system of dots credited to Aristophanes of Byzantium was developed in the 3rd century BC: a low dot  marked an occasion for a short breath after a short phrase, a middot  marked an occasion for a longer breath after a longer passage, and a high dot  marked a full stop at the end of a completed thought. Other writers employed two dot punctuation  to mark the ends of sentences or changing speakers. Less often, arrangements of three , four , and five dots  appeared. Blank lines or various  marked the ends of sections. (A separate  was used to mark contractions; its early forms looked like an apostrophe between the two elided words.) These served to show whether an ambiguous series of letters should be read as (respectively) a single word or as a pair of words. Later Aristarchus of Samothrace modified this system (see: Aristarchian symbols).

In printing 
The full stop serves as the thousands separator, and guillemets ( isagoyika) and em-length quotation dashes ( pavla) typically serve to indicate direct speech. When quotations are nested, double and then single quotation marks are used: . The right-pointing double Guillemets ( omiomatiká)  serve as Ditto mark. The principal difference is the Greek question mark , which developed a shape so similar to the Latinate semicolon  that Unicode decomposes its separate code point identically. The  middot serves as the Greek semicolon, but is so uncommon that it has often been left off of Greek keyboards. 

One of the few places where  exists is on the Microsoft Windows Polytonic Greek keyboard (having the driver name KBDHEPT.DLL).

The exclamation mark ( thavmastikó) is mostly used as in English. The hyphen, the brackets, the colon, the ellipsis and the slash are also in use. The slash has the additional function of forming common abbreviations like  for  'brothers'. The ligature kai (ϗ) is sometimes used for the same function as the English ampersand.

In Greek numerals 
There are special rules for how to write Greek numerals. In modern Greek, a number of changes have been made. The modern  is a symbol (ʹ) similar to the acute accent (´), but has its own Unicode character, encoded as U+0374. A lower left  (Unicode: U+0375, "Greek Lower Numeral Sign") is now standard for identifying thousands: 2015 is represented as ͵ΒΙΕʹ (2000 + 10 + 5).

See also
Ancient Greek phonology
Greek braille
Obelism
Greek grammar
Greek language question
Greek ligatures
Iota subscript
Katharevousa
Modern Greek phonology
Pronunciation of Ancient Greek in teaching
Romanization of Greek

References

External links
 Greek Unicode Issues by Nick Nicholas
 The Details of Modern Greek Phonetics and Phonology, by Harry Foundalis

Orthography
Orthographies by language
Greek alphabet
Ancient Greek punctuation